Stacy is a zouk singer from Martinique and Guyana who sings in French and Creole.

Biography 

She grew up in the grew up in the Volga-plage and Baie des Tourelles neighbourhoods in Fort-de-France, Martinique. Her father is also a zouk singer.

Career 
Her first single recorded with Dj Creeks MX,  was a hit, charting at number 1 in the French West Indies and Guyana in 2014; its official video has been viewed over 10 million times on YouTube.

She has made appearances on television including France 24, in the programme  and at the Olympia Hall.

Stacy was nominated for Best New International Act at the BET awards in 2020. At the Soul Train Music Awards later that year, she performed in Creole as Soul Cypher, where guests show their talent by freestyling over an instrumental track.

Stacy has recently moved from releasing singles to creating an album with her new label, Aztec Musique, the same label who signed Edith Lefel. As of March 2022 her track  has had nearly four million views on YouTube. It inspired a number of lipsync videos; Stacy has said in an interview that she is pleased to see her work and language resonate and become better known in this way, defying an expectation that Creole language music cannot be exported from the Caribbean.

Album 
2020  (Aztec Musique)

References 

People from Fort-de-France
Zouk musicians
21st-century French singers
21st-century Guyanese singers
Martiniquais singers
Living people
Year of birth missing (living people)